Pakxan (Paksan or Muang Pakxan) (Lao ປາກຊັນ)  is a district and a town in Bolikhamsai Province, in western Laos. It is the capital of Pakxan District. The Nam Xan River joins the Mekong River at Pakxan on the border with Thailand, opposite Bueng Kan. Pakxan is connected to the south of Laos by Route 13.

History
Pakxan was founded in the late-19th century. The Pakxan region had experienced insecurity since the invasion by Annam in 1834, followed by invasions by the Siamese, and Siamese sovereignty over Laos in 1836, and especially after 1865 with the invasions of Haws or "red flags", gangs from southern China. These invasions began to reduce the populations of Xieng Khouang and Bolikhamsai, but it was the Siamese who completed the depopulation by deporting most of the Phou Eun inhabiting the region.

In 1876, Rama V, King of Siam, ordered the creation of Bolikhamsai with the last survivors of the Haw invasion of 1874. Bolikhamsai was placed under the authority of Kha Luang Nong Khai. From 1885, the French who took over neighboring Vietnam, challenged Siamese sovereignty over Laos, and after Auguste Pavie's mission dating the Mekong to Luang Prabang, the Siamese were forced to leave the left bank of Mekong and evacuate the position they had created at the mouth of the Nam Xan River. At that time, Patchoum Muong (or Paxum) was the largest town near the confluence of the Nam Xan, but it is on the Nam Xan, a half-day by boat up the Mekong.

In the course of the 1890s, missionaries of the Missions étrangères de Paris, attached to the mission of Christianity to a Bangkok-based Keng-Sadok, on the Mekong River, a few miles from the mouth of the Nam Xan. Then the missionaries occupied Pakxan, abandoned by the Siamese, and there built a church. [4] In 1911, Bolikhamsai had about 61 villages with a population of about 4,000 inhabitants. In 1937, when Vientiane Province was cut in half, Pakxan alone had a population of 1,000 people and became the capital of the new province.

References

External links

Populated places in Bolikhamsai Province
Populated places on the Mekong River
Laos–Thailand border crossings
Provincial capitals in Laos